Anderlues is a municipality of Wallonia located in the province of Hainaut, Belgium. 

On 1 January 2006 Anderlues had a total population of 11,578. Its postcode is 6150.

On 1 December 1983 a local jewellery store was robbed by the Brabant killers.  Some low-value jewels were stolen and two people were killed in what was the gang's last robbery before going silent for one year.

References

External links
 

Municipalities of Hainaut (province)